Dioryx is a genus of air-breathing land snails in the family Alycaeidae. It was formerly considered a subgenus of Alycaeus.

Species
Species within the genus Dioryx include:
 Dioryx amphora (Benson, 1856)
 Dioryx bacca (L. Pfeiffer, 1863)
 Dioryx cariniger Möllendorff, 1897
 Dioryx compactus (Bavay & Dautzenberg, 1900)
 Dioryx dautzenbergi Páll-Gergely, 2017
 Dioryx distortus (Haines, 1855)
 Dioryx dongiensis Varga, 1972
 Dioryx feddenianus (Theobald, 1870)
 Dioryx globulosus (Godwin-Austen, 1914)
 Dioryx globulus (Möllendorff, 1885)
 Dioryx kobeltianus (Möllendorff, 1874)
 Dioryx menglunensis D.-N. Chen & G.-Q. Zhang, 1998
 Dioryx messageri (Bavay & Dautzenberg, 1900)
 Dioryx monadicus (Heude, 1890)
 Dioryx pilula (Gould, 1859)
 Dioryx pocsi Varga, 1972
 Dioryx requiescens (J. Mabille, 1887)
 Dioryx rosea (Bavay & Dautzenberg, 1900)
 Dioryx setchuanensis (Heude, 1885)
 Dioryx swinhoei (H. Adams, 1866)
 Dioryx urceolus (Godwin-Austen, 1914)
 Dioryx urnula (Benson, 1853)
 Dioryx varius (Godwin-Austen, 1914)

References

 Bavay, A. & Dautzenberg, P., 1900. Description de coquilles nouvelles de l'Indo-Chine (2ème partie). Journal de Conchyliologie 48: 435-460
 Bavay, A. & Dautzenberg, P., 1900. Diagnose de nouveaux mollusques d'Indo-Chine. Journal de Conchyliologie 48: 108-122
 Fischer-Piette, E., 1950. Liste des types décrits dans le Journal de Conchyliologie et conservés dans la collection de ce journal (avec planches)(suite). Journal de Conchyliologie 90: 149-180
 Bank, R. A. (2017). Classification of the Recent terrestrial Gastropoda of the World. Last update: July 16th, 2017
Annotated checklist of the terrestrial molluscs from Laos (Mollusca, Gastropoda). ZooKeys 834: 1-166

Alycaeidae